Bearhole Lake Provincial Park is a provincial park in British Columbia, Canada, 5 km east of the mining community of Tumbler Ridge, on the Alberta Plateau.  Established in January 2001, the park includes 12,705 ha of land in the Boreal White and Black Spruce biogeoclimatic zones within the Kiskatinaw Plateau. It is transition zone with mixed wood forests including spruce, pine, and larch. Bearhole Lake, the headwaters of the Kiskatinaw River provides habitat for trumpeter swans, yellow perch, burbot, rainbow trout, and northern pike.

References
British Columbia. Ministry of Employment and Investment (March 1999). Dawson Creek Land & Resource Management Plan, p. 43.
Ministry of Environment

External links

Peace River Country
Provincial parks of British Columbia
2001 establishments in British Columbia